Rafael de Araújo or Rafael Araújo may refer to:

 Rafael Araújo (basketball) (born 1980), Brazilian basketball player
 Rafael Araújo (footballer, born 1984), Brazilian football defender
 Rafael Araújo (footballer, born 1988), Brazilian football centre-back
 Rafael Araújo (volleyball) (born 1991), Brazilian volleyball player
 Rafael Araujo-Lopes (born 1996), American football wide receiver